Prestige Communications was a broadcast radio station group in Macomb, Illinois. It operated six stations in west-central Illinois owned by the husband-wife team of Bruce T. Foster and Nancy L. Foster.

All six stations were sold to Virden Broadcasting Corp. effective November 30, 2015, at a purchase price of $725,000.

Station ownership
 Central Illinois Broadcasting Company — 74% Bruce Foster; 26% Nancy Foster shares voted by Bruce Foster
 102.7 WJEQ Macomb, Illinois — from bankrupt McDonough Broadcasting, Inc. on 14 June 1989
 Colchester Radio, Inc. — 100% owned by Nancy Foster
 1510 WLRB Macomb, Illinois — from WPW Broadcasting on 6 January 2009
 100.1 WKAI Macomb, Illinois — from WPW Broadcasting on 6 January 2009
 104.1 WMQZ Colchester, Illinois — licensed as new on 9 June 1999
 104.7 WLMD Bushnell, Illinois — from WPW Broadcasting on 6 January 2009
 Nancy L. Foster — as sole proprietor
 95.9 WNLF Macomb, Illinois — FCC construction permit granted by Auction #25, MX FM 51, in 1996; licensed as new 16 March 2001

References

External links
 Prestige Communications — official site
 "Local radio stations sold" — July 17, 2008, article by Bill Ford of the Macomb Journal

Defunct radio broadcasting companies of the United States
Defunct broadcasting companies of the United States
Macomb, Illinois
Mass media in Illinois
2015 mergers and acquisitions